James Bowen Everhart (July 26, 1821 – August 23, 1888) was an American politician from Pennsylvania who served as a Republican member of the U.S. House of Representatives for Pennsylvania's 6th congressional district from 1883 to 1887.  He also served as a member of the Pennsylvania State Senate for the 19th district from 1876 to 1882.

Biography
James B. Everhart was born in West Whiteland Township, Pennsylvania to William Everhart and Hannah (Matlack) Everhart.  He attended Bolmar's Academy in West Chester and graduated from Princeton College in 1842.  He studied law at Harvard University and in Philadelphia, Pennsylvania.  He was admitted to the bar in 1845 and went abroad and spent two years in study at the Universities of Berlin and Edinburgh.  He returned to West Chester and engaged in the practice of law.  During the American Civil War, Everhart served in Company B, Tenth Regiment, Pennsylvania Militia.  He served as a member of the Pennsylvania State Senate for the 19th district from 1876 to 1882.

Everhart was elected as a Republican to the Forty-eighth and Forty-ninth Congresses.  He was an unsuccessful candidate for renomination in 1886.  He resumed the practice of law and died in West Chester in 1888.  Interment in Oaklands Cemetery, in West Chester.

Writings
His writings, which are marked by terseness of style, include Miscellanies, in prose (West Chester, Pa, 1862); a volume of short poems (Philadelphia, 1868); and "The Fox Chase," a poem (Philadelphia, 1875).

Family
His grandfather, James Everhart, was a soldier in the U.S. Army during the American Revolutionary War.  His father William was a successful merchant in West Chester, Pennsylvania and a U.S. Congressman.  His brother Benjamin Matlack Everhart was a noted mycologist.

Notes

References
 Retrieved on 2008-02-14
The Political Graveyard

External links

|-

1821 births
1888 deaths
19th-century American politicians
American male poets
Burials at Oaklands Cemetery
Harvard Law School alumni
Pennsylvania lawyers
Republican Party Pennsylvania state senators
People of Pennsylvania in the American Civil War
People from West Chester, Pennsylvania
Poets from Pennsylvania
Princeton University alumni
Republican Party members of the United States House of Representatives from Pennsylvania
Union Army soldiers
19th-century American lawyers